Ruben Fabián Pereira Márquez (born 28 January 1968 in Montevideo) is a Uruguayan former footballer.

International career
Pereira made 27 appearances for the senior Uruguay national football team from 1988 to 1996, including two appearances at the 1990 FIFA World Cup finals. He also played in the 1989 Copa América.

References

 

1968 births
Living people
Uruguayan footballers
Uruguay international footballers
1990 FIFA World Cup players
1989 Copa América players
Danubio F.C. players
Club Nacional de Football players
Peñarol players
U.S. Cremonese players
Boca Juniors footballers
Footballers from Montevideo
Uruguayan Primera División players
Serie A players
Argentine Primera División players
Uruguayan expatriate footballers
Expatriate footballers in Italy
Expatriate footballers in Argentina

Association football midfielders